The 1946–47 Greek Football Cup was the fifth edition of the Greek Football Cup. It was the first Greek Cup tournament to be held after the end of World War II. The competition culminated with the Greek Cup Final, held at Leoforos Alexandras Stadium, on 8 June 1947. The match was contested by Olympiacos and Iraklis, with Olympiacos winning by 5–0.

Calendar

Qualification round

First round

|-
|colspan="3" style="background-color:#D0D0D0" align=center|Athens Football Clubs Association

|-
|colspan="3" style="background-color:#D0D0D0" align=center|Piraeus Football Clubs Association

|-
|colspan="3" style="background-color:#D0D0D0" align=center|Macedonia Football Clubs Association

|}

Second round

|-
|colspan="3" style="background-color:#D0D0D0" align=center|Athens Football Clubs Association

|-
|colspan="3" style="background-color:#D0D0D0" align=center|Piraeus Football Clubs Association

|-
|colspan="3" style="background-color:#D0D0D0" align=center|Macedonia Football Clubs Association

|-
|colspan="3" style="background-color:#D0D0D0" align=center|Patras Football Clubs Association

|-
|colspan="3" style="background-color:#D0D0D0" align=center|Thessaly/Euboea Football Clubs Association

|}

Third round

|-
|colspan="3" style="background-color:#D0D0D0" align=center|Athens Football Clubs Association

|-
|colspan="3" style="background-color:#D0D0D0" align=center|Piraeus Football Clubs Association

|-
|colspan="3" style="background-color:#D0D0D0" align=center|Macedonia Football Clubs Association

|-
|colspan="3" style="background-color:#D0D0D0" align=center|Patras Football Clubs Association

|-
|colspan="3" style="background-color:#D0D0D0" align=center|Thrace/Eastern Macedonia Football Clubs Association

|-
|colspan="3" style="background-color:#D0D0D0" align=center|Thessaly/Euboea Football Clubs Association

|-
|colspan="3" style="background-color:#D0D0D0" align=center|Crete Football Clubs Association

|}

Additional round

|-
|colspan="3" style="background-color:#D0D0D0" align=center|Athens Football Clubs Association

|-
|colspan="3" style="background-color:#D0D0D0" align=center|Piraeus Football Clubs Association

|-
|colspan="3" style="background-color:#D0D0D0" align=center|Patras Football Clubs Association

|-
|colspan="3" style="background-color:#D0D0D0" align=center|Thrace/Eastern Macedonia Football Clubs Association

|}

Fourth round

|-
|colspan="3" style="background-color:#D0D0D0" align=center|Athens Football Clubs Association

|-
|colspan="3" style="background-color:#D0D0D0" align=center|Piraeus Football Clubs Association

|-
|colspan="3" style="background-color:#D0D0D0" align=center|Macedonia Football Clubs Association

|}

Fifth round

|-
|colspan="5" style="background-color:#D0D0D0" align=center|Athens Football Clubs Association
||colspan="2" 
|-
|colspan="5" style="background-color:#D0D0D0" align=center|Piraeus Football Clubs Association

|-
|colspan="5" style="background-color:#D0D0D0" align=center|Macedonia Football Clubs Association
||colspan="2" 
|-
|colspan="5" style="background-color:#D0D0D0" align=center|Patras Football Clubs Association
||colspan="2" 
|-
|colspan="5" style="background-color:#D0D0D0" align=center|Thrace/Eastern Macedonia Football Clubs Association
||colspan="2" rowspan="3" 

||colspan="2" rowspan="2" 

|-
|colspan="5" style="background-color:#D0D0D0" align=center|Thessaly/Euboea Football Clubs Association

|}

Sixth round

|-
|colspan="3" style="background-color:#D0D0D0" align=center|Athens Football Clubs Association

|-
|colspan="3" style="background-color:#D0D0D0" align=center|Piraeus Football Clubs Association

|-
|colspan="3" style="background-color:#D0D0D0" align=center|Macedonia Football Clubs Association

|-
|colspan="3" style="background-color:#D0D0D0" align=center|Patras Football Clubs Association

|-
|colspan="3" style="background-color:#D0D0D0" align=center|Thrace/Eastern Macedonia Football Clubs Association

|-
|colspan="3" style="background-color:#D0D0D0" align=center|Thessaly/Euboea Football Clubs Association

|-
|colspan="3" style="background-color:#D0D0D0" align=center|Crete Football Clubs Association

|}

Seventh round

|-
|colspan="3" style="background-color:#D0D0D0" align=center|Athens Football Clubs Association

|-
|colspan="3" style="background-color:#D0D0D0" align=center|Piraeus Football Clubs Association

|-
|colspan="3" style="background-color:#D0D0D0" align=center|Macedonia Football Clubs Association

|-
|colspan="3" style="background-color:#D0D0D0" align=center|Patras Football Clubs Association

|-
|colspan="3" style="background-color:#D0D0D0" align=center|Thrace/Eastern Macedonia Football Clubs Association

|}

Eighth round

|-
|colspan="5" style="background-color:#D0D0D0" align=center|Patras Football Clubs Association

|-
|colspan="5" style="background-color:#D0D0D0" align=center|Thrace/Eastern Macedonia Football Clubs Association
||colspan="2" 
|}

* Replay match.

**After the third match a draw occurred which favoured Amyna Piraeus.

***The first match ended up as a draw and Apollon Serres won after a replay match.

Knockout phase
In the knockout phase, teams play against each other over a single match. If the match ends up as a draw, extra time will be played and if the match remains a draw a replay match is set at the home of the guest team which the extra time rule stands as well. That procedure will be repeated until a winner occurs. The mechanism of the draws for each round is as follows:
In the draw for the round of 16, the eight top teams of each association are seeded and the eight clubs that passed the qualification round are unseeded.The seeded teams are drawn against the unseeded teams.
In the draws for the quarter-finals onwards, there are no seedings, and teams from the same group can be drawn against each other.

Bracket

Round of 16

||colspan="2" rowspan="6" 

|}

Quarter-finals

|}

Semi-finals

|}

Final

The 5th Greek Cup Final was played at the Leoforos Alexandras Stadium.

References

External links
Greek Cup 1946-47 at RSSSF

Greek Football Cup seasons
Greek Cup
1946–47 in Greek football